Elisabeth of Hesse (13 February 1539 – 14 March 1582) was a German noblewoman.

She was a daughter of Philip I, Landgrave of Hesse and Christine of Saxony, daughter of George, Duke of Saxony.

On 8 July 1560 she married Louis VI, Elector Palatine. They had the following children:
 Anna Marie (1561–1589), married Charles IX of Sweden
 Elisabeth (15 June – 2 November 1562)
 Dorothea Elisabeth (12 January – 7 March 1565)
 Dorothea (1566–1567)
 Frederick Philip (19 October 1567 – 14 November 1568)
 Johann Friedrich (died within a month of birth)
 Ludwig (died within three months of birth)
 Katharina (1572–1586)
 Christine (1573–1619)
 Frederick (1574–1610), succeeded as Elector Palatine
 Philip (4 May 1575 – 9 August 1575)
 Elisabeth (1576–1577)

Ancestors 

|-

1539 births
1582 deaths
Electresses of the Palatinate
House of Hesse
Princesses of the Palatinate
House of Wittelsbach
16th-century German people
16th-century German women
Burials at the Church of the Holy Spirit, Heidelberg
Daughters of monarchs